The 1973 Tanglewood International Tennis Classic was a men's tennis tournament held at Tanglewood Park in Clemmons, North Carolina in the United States that was part of the Grand Prix circuit and categorized as a Group C event. The tournament was played on outdoor clay courts and was held from August 6 until August 12, 1973. It was the third and last edition of the tournament. Second-seeded Jaime Fillol won the singles title, his second at the event after 1971, and earned $5,000 first-prize money.

Finals

Singles
 Jaime Fillol defeated  Gerald Battrick 6–2, 6–4
 It was Fillol's 1st singles title of the year and the 3rd of his career.

Doubles
 Bob Carmichael /  Frew McMillan defeated  Brian Fairlie /  Ismail El Shafei 6–3, 6–4

References

External links
 ITF tournament edition details

Tanglewood International Tennis Classic
Tanglewood International Tennis Classic
Tanglewood International Tennis Classic
Tanglewood International Tennis Classic
Rainier International Tennis Classic, 1973